Stéphane Wohnlich (born 11 December 1968) is a Swiss sailor. He competed in the Tornado event at the 1996 Summer Olympics.

References

External links
 

1968 births
Living people
Swiss male sailors (sport)
Olympic sailors of Switzerland
Sailors at the 1996 Summer Olympics – Tornado
Place of birth missing (living people)
20th-century Swiss people